Belegarth Medieval Combat Society is a full contact battle game where foam weapons are used in order to prevent serious physical injury to participants. It differs from other battle games and LARPs in that it is entirely combat-oriented that allows hard hitting, shield bashes, and grappling with little emphasis on role playing and has no magic or character classes. It is composed of a number of not-for-profit "realms", which compete at regional and national events every year. Typically, each realm also holds individual fighting practices several times a week. Realms vary in size from just a handful of people to over a hundred fighters.

The organization initially formed from a set of loosely organized clubs and franchises starting in December 2001. In July 2002 the group was organized enough to incorporate in the State of Illinois.

Gameplay
Belegarth Medieval Combat Society is a sport where participants fight with foam padded safety equipment made to reflect medieval weaponry. The sport's combat is hard hitting and fast-paced, governed by a set of easy-to-learn rules, and requires a level of skill and aggression that challenges its participants to be physically fit.

Gameplay is overseen by marshals, known as heralds (or referees) wearing yellow tabards. In the most basic sense, hits are scored by landing a blow with sufficient force to any of the four target-zones: torso, legs, arms or head. For safety reasons, the head is an illegal target for melee weapons, but is a legal target for missile weapons like arrows and javelins. A player is considered "dead" after a torso or head hit, or any combination of two extremities. "Dead" players are out of play for the remainder of the battle, which usually lasts five to ten minutes (depending on the battle scenario), and must act as such. Once the battle is over, each team regroups for the next fight.

During the event players are requested to wear clothing that is known as "garb", medieval or fantasy-based clothing. Players go by chosen Belegarth names to avoid confusion on the field as there are frequently numerous players on the field that share common given names.

Non-combat
At national events, some participants come merely for the social get together. They can hone their skills for making both the weaponry and the armor involved.

History
JRR Tolkien's novels The Lord of the Rings inspired a new-found interest in fantasy with the love of the outdoors, improvisational acting, and high energy events. A group called Dagorhir was formed in 1977 with these very ideals in mind. The theme was to catapult people from the 20th century into the midst of an intense battle during the Dark Ages; a time when the values and problems of the modern world did not exist. Dagorhir grew rapidly over the years into a nationwide organization.  In 2001, in efforts to protect their intellectual property, such as the original Dagorhir Handbook, the Dagorhir Board of Directors requested that any group wishing to continue to use the Dagorhir brand name sign a legally binding contract regarding their use. Those that did not agree with this form of governance broke off from Dagorhir in order to form Belegarth.

Chapters
Belegarth chapters, called "realms", range all across North America: from Puerto Rico up to Canada, and all across the continental United States.  Chapters vary organizationally, ranging from realms to kingdoms, to loose confederations of "tribes" depending on the local chapter, its history and its membership. Chapters vary widely in size, age, interests, membership and geography, but a common interest in medieval combat unites them all. Belegarth: MCS includes a vast nationwide membership, and they encourage new members.  

See The Belegarth Realms Map for a complete list of Realms.

National events
Realms gather at the national events, week or weekend long camping events, that involve fighting during the day and partying at nights, and where members wear garb and go by their dedicated Belegarth names. 

 Spring Wars – early April
 Beltaine – early May
 Melcacorne – late May
 Armageddon – mid June
 Summer Wars - TBA
 Chaos Wars – late July
 Equinox – late September
 Oktoberfest – early October
War of Wrath – mid October 
 Battle for the Ring - mid January

See also
Amtgard
Dagorhir
Darkon

References
Belegarth Medieval Combat Society. "Belegarth Medieval Combat Society". September 27, 2011. https://web.archive.org/web/20110928031639/http://www.belegarth.com/index.php

External links

National Website
MediaWiki dedicated to Belegarth
Rules of the Game
National Forums
Getting Started

External news articles

News Article 03/29/2011 Indiana Daily Student
Magazine Article 12/07/2006 Weekly Buzz
News Article 10/25/2006 Daily Chronicle
News Article 10/23/06 Daily Illini
News Article 08/2006 College News
News Article 05/04/2006 Arbiter Online
  April Fool's Day Feature 3/31/2006 Student Life
News Article 06/30/2006 Den News
News article? 05/24/06 San Diego CityBeat
News Article 08/03/2005 Minnesota Daily
News article 08/30/05 Daily Iowan
News Article 05/15/2005 Fox News
News Article 03/04/2005 Northern Star
News Article 10/08/2004 Daily Vidette
 Magazine Article 9/22/2004 Versus Magazine
News Article 09/18/2002 Daily Iowan
Online Featurette 10/19/07 The Daily Eastern News

Live-action battle gaming
Live-action role-playing games
Sports in Illinois
Non-profit organizations based in Illinois